The New York State Office of Children and Family Services (OCFS) is an agency of the New York state government within the Department of Family Assistance. The office has its headquarters in the Capital View Office Park in Rensselaer.

History
OCFS was officially created on January 8, 1998, by merging the programs of the former state Division for Youth, the developmental and preventive children and family programs administered by the former state Department of Social Services, and the Commission for the Blind and Visually Handicapped.

Role
OCFS has wide-ranging responsibilities for the provision of services to children, youth, families, and vulnerable adults. The agency is responsible for programs and services involving foster care, adoption, and adoption assistance; child protective services, including operating the Statewide Central Register of Child Abuse and Maltreatment; preventive services for children and families; child care and referral programs; and protective programs for vulnerable adults. Additionally, OCFS is responsible for the state's juvenile justice programs, administering and managing residential facilities located across New York State for youth remanded to the agency's custody by family and criminal courts. The agency also supports and monitors detention, aftercare, and a range of community-based programs. OCFS also coordinates, in part, the state government response to the needs of Native Americans and their children on reservations and in communities.

Prevention and rehabilitation efforts are joint ventures with local and county government, supported by federal, state, county, and municipal funds, as well as private contributions. OCFS provides technical and financial assistance to agencies involved in community youth programs and monitors activities of voluntary child-care and detention agencies in New York State.

Structure
The agency divides its responsibilities into two main areas: program and support. The program divisions/offices include:

 Division of Child Welfare and Community Services
 Division of Juvenile Justice and Opportunities for Youth
 Division of Youth Development and Partnerships for Success
 Office of Juvenile Justice Oversight and Improvement
 Division of Child Care Services
 Commission for the Blind

The support divisions/offices include:

 Division of Administration
 Division of Legal Affairs
 Office of Communications
 Office of Strategic Planning and Policy Development
 Office of Special Investigations
 Office of Equal Opportunity and Diversity Development
 Office of the Ombudsman

OCFS has regional offices in Albany, Buffalo, New York City, Rochester, Syracuse, and Westchester and Long Island. The Regional Offices help districts and agencies keep children safe, achieve permanency, and improve the quality of life for children and families. Regional offices provide "oversight" to local districts and voluntary agencies. The responsibility to provide oversight is defined as (1) assuring compliance with OCFS regulations, (2) reinforcing good practice standards, and (3) improving district/agency capacity to achieve positive outcomes for children and families.

The agency's Bureau of Training maintains the Parker Training Academy.  Located on the academy grounds is a Dutch barn added to the National Register of Historic Places in 2007.

The state Council on Children and Families was created by Governor Carey in 1977, and administratively merged with OCFS in 2003. The council does not have direct responsibility for the operation of programs or the provision of services, but instead orients its priorities toward the development of comprehensive and coordinated systems of care that respond to the wide needs of children and families.

Juvenile facilities

Secure facilities:
 Brookwood Residential Center
 Columbia Girls Secure Center
 Goshen Secure Center 
 Brentwood Girls Secure Center
Harriet Tubman Girls Secure Center

Limited secure facilities:
 Finger Lakes Residential Center 
 Highland Residential Center
 Industry Residential Center
 Taberg Residential Center for Girls
MacCormick Residential Center

Non-secure facility:
 Red Hook Residential Center

Closed Facilities
 Sgt. Henry Johnson Youth Leadership Academy (Closed Down)

See also
 New York City Administration for Children's Services

References

External links
Official website
 Department of Social Services in the New York Codes, Rules and Regulations
 Office of Children and Family Services on Open NY (https://data.ny.gov/)
 Council on Children and Families on Open NY (https://data.ny.gov/)
 New York Office of Children and Family Services recipient profile on USAspending.gov

Child abuse in the United States
Child welfare in the United States
State law enforcement agencies of New York (state)
State corrections departments of the United States
Juvenile detention centers in the United States
1998 establishments in New York (state)
Government agencies established in 1998